LLAF Cup is an annual track and field event in Lithuania organized by the Athletics Federation of Lithuania ( or LLAF). All Lithuanian athletics clubs are competing in the championship. Team that won most titles is Cosma from capital city of Vilnius. The LLAF Cup is also national championship for decathlon and heptathlon.

Championships

External links 
 Official website

Athletics competitions in Lithuania